In pathology, salt-and-pepper chromatin, also salt-and-pepper nuclei and stippled chromatin, refers to cell nuclei that demonstrate granular chromatin (on light microscopy).

Salt-and-pepper chromatin is typically seen in endocrine tumours such as medullary thyroid carcinoma, neuroendocrine tumours and pheochromocytoma.

Additional images

References

External links
Salt-and-pepper chromatin - nature.com.
Salt-and-pepper nucleus - upmc.edu.

Pathology